|}

The Salsabil Stakes is a Listed flat horse race in Ireland open to three-year-old thoroughbred fillies. It is run at Navan over a distance of 1 mile and 2 furlongs (2,012 metres), and it is scheduled to take place each year in April.

The race was first run in 2003.  It is named in honor of Salsabil who won the 1000 Guineas, Oaks and Irish Derby in 1990.

Records
Most successful horse:
 no horse has won this race more than once

Leading jockey (5 wins):
 Fran Berry – Allexina (2005), Indiana Girl (2009), Siren's Song (2011), Alive Alive Oh (2013), Bocca Baciata (2015)

Leading trainer (6 wins):
 Aidan O'Brien - All Too Beautiful (2004), Kissed (2012), Dazzling (2014), Pretty Perfect (2016), Pink Dogwood (2019), Concert Hall (2022)

Winners

See also
 Horse racing in Ireland
 List of Irish flat horse races

References
Racing Post:

Flat races in Ireland
Navan Racecourse
Flat horse races for three-year-old fillies
Recurring sporting events established in 2003
2003 establishments in Ireland